Duane Raymond Hall, II (born February 6, 1967) is an American attorney and politician. Elected to the North Carolina House of Representatives 11th district in 2012, Representative Hall was chosen by his colleagues to serve as Freshman Leader. Re-elected in 2014, Rep. Hall was ranked as one of the most effective Democratic members of the North Carolina General Assembly's 2015-2017 session.

In 2018 North Carolina Governor Roy Cooper appointed Representative Hall to serve as Chairman of the North Carolina Courts Commission. In his final term, ending in 2019, Representative Hall was the primary sponsor of more successful legislation than any other Democratic member of the House, including the landmark Raise the Age bill, which raised the age of juvenile jurisdiction.

In 2013, Hall sponsored a successful bill that encouraged mediation between landlords and homeowners associations. He has been a major critic of a 2013 North Carolina voter I.D. law that was passed following Shelby County v. Holder.

Hall is currently in private law practice in Raleigh , North Carolina, specializing in Real Estate law, eminent domain and personal injury.

References

External links
 
North Carolina General Assembly
Campaign Website

Living people
Democratic Party members of the North Carolina House of Representatives
North Carolina State University alumni
Florida State University College of Law alumni
People from High Point, North Carolina
21st-century American politicians
1967 births